Daguan District is an urban district of the city of Anqing, Anhui Province, People's Republic of China.

Administrative divisions
Daguan District has jurisdiction over seven subdistricts, including Haikou Town and Yamaguchi Township.

Yulin Road Subdistrict, Dekuan Road Subdistrict, Longshan Road Subdistrict, Jixuan Road Subdistrict, Huaxiang Road Subdistrict, Shihua Road Subdistrict, Linghu Subdistrict
Towns:
Haikou

External links

County-level divisions of Anhui
Anqing